Yaqin Ali Tappeh (also Romanized as Yaqīn ʿAlī Tappeh; also known as Yāghlān Tappeh and Yaghn‘alī Tappeh) is a village in Marhemetabad Rural District, in the Central District of Miandoab County, West Azerbaijan Province, Iran. At the 2006 census, its population was 1,816, in 467 families.

References 

Populated places in Miandoab County